KGFM (101.5 MHz, "101.5 Big FM") is a commercial FM radio station in Bakersfield, California.  The station is owned by American General Media and the license is held by AGM California.  KGFM airs an adult hits format.

The studios and offices are on Easton Drive.  The transmitter is off Breckenridge Road. DECEMBER  4 2018 TODAY BEST HITS  MUSIC  2018 DECEMBER KGFM 10 15 FM RADIO  NOVEMBER 30

History
On October 1, 1964, KGFM first signed on the air.  It was the sister station of AM 1230 KGEE (now KGEO).  Originally, KGFM was largely an instrumental beautiful music station through the 1960s and 70s.  By the 1980s, it was adding more vocals and had moved to an easy listening sound.   By 1992, KGFM completed the transition to soft adult contemporary.  KGFM stayed with Soft AC until 2005, when the decision was made to emphasize gold product.

In 2007, the station evolved toward a soft adult hits format. During the weekends, it played songs from the 1960s and 1970s, which targeted the Baby Boomer demographic.

Rebrand 
In 2013, KGFM began its transition toward a hot AC format, dropping all songs from before 1980.  KGFM rebranded as "101.5 Today's Best Mix."  By 2015, KGFM was only playing songs recorded after 2000.

On April 1, 2021, KGFM changed their format from hot adult contemporary to adult hits, branded as "101.5 Big FM".

Programming
The programming on this station features weekday mornings with E.J. Tyler, Becky on middays, and Jennifer Grant on afternoons.

References

External links
KGFM official website
101.5 KGFM - Radio Online Live

Adult hits radio stations in the United States
GFM
Radio stations established in 1992